Letiny is a municipality and village in Plzeň-South District in the Plzeň Region of the Czech Republic. It has about 700 inhabitants.

Administrative parts
Villages of Bzí, Chocenický Újezd, Kbelnice and Svárkov are administrative parts of Letiny.

Notable people
Vilém Dušan Lambl (1824–1895), physician and author

References

Villages in Plzeň-South District